Giovanni Mercati (17 December 1866 – 23 August 1957) was an Italian cardinal of the Roman Catholic Church. He served as archivist of the Vatican Secret Archives and librarian of the Vatican Library from 1936 until his death, and was elevated to the cardinalate in 1936.

Biography
Giovanni Mercati was born in Villa Gaida, Reggio Emilia, to a devout Christian family. He was the second of four brothers, the elder and third brothers were also priests, as was his uncle, Giuseppe Mercati, who served as a pastor in Castellarano. Giovanni's father, a veterinarian, was a close friend of the Redemptorists of Madonna dell'Olmo, Montecchio Emilia, and after the closure of the convent in 1859, a sizable portion of its library was placed in the Mercati home.

Mercati studied at the minor seminary of Marola, Reggio Emilia, from 1876 to 1882, earning his licence ginnasiale. He entered the classical Lyceum Spallanzani in 1883, and later the seminary of Reggio Emilia. He was ordained to the priesthood on 21 September 1889, and then was sent for further studies to Rome where he resided at the Pontifical Lambard Seminary, and studies at the Pontifical Gregorian University, which granted him his doctorate in theology in the summer of 1891. With him in Rome at the same semimary was his brother Angelo (who would later gain fame for editing the official list of popes). During this period in Rome, Giovanni frequented the public sessions of Accademia di Conferenze storico-giuridiche, and was admitted to use of the Vatican Library in February 1890. Have gained his doctorate, Mercati then underwent his obligatory military service in Florence as a medical attendant (soldato di sanità) until 1893.

On 9 November 1893, he was elected a doctor of the Ambrosian Library in Milan (where he became friends with Achille Ratti), and in October 1898 he was called by Pope Leo XIII to work at the Vatican Library. In the summer of 1930, for reasons of personal health, he was relieved of administrative duties at the library. On 12 January 1936 Mercati was given the honorific title of  protonotary apostolic.

Pope Pius XI created him Cardinal-Deacon of S. Giorgio in Velabro in the consistory of 15 June 1936, in advance of his appointment three days later, on 18 June, as librarian and archivist of the Holy Roman Church.  Mercati was one of the cardinal electors who participated in the 1939 papal conclave, which elected Pope Pius XII. During the early years of World War II, the Cardinal, a known opponent of Fascism, was protected and supported by a number of émigré scholars from Germany. From 1951 to 1952, he served as camerlengo of the Sacred College of Cardinals. A prolific writer and great humanist, he understood Aramaic and the intricacies of racing automobiles and rocketry; he was even called the "most learned prelate to be elevated to the sacred purple" in a century. He was also once quoted as saying, "I'm always ready to learn".

Cardinal Mercati died from a heart attack in Vatican City, at the age of 90. He is buried in his cardinal's church of San Giorgio in Velabro in Rome.

References

External links 
 Catholic-Hierarchy
 Cardinals of the Holy Roman Church

1866 births
1957 deaths
People from Reggio Emilia
Italian archivists
20th-century Italian cardinals
20th-century Italian Roman Catholic titular archbishops
Members of the Prussian Academy of Sciences
Members of the Hungarian Academy of Sciences
Italian Byzantinists
Prefects of the Vatican Library
Corresponding Fellows of the Medieval Academy of America
20th-century Italian historians
19th-century Italian historians
Members of the German Academy of Sciences at Berlin